Tolivia is one of nine parishes (administrative divisions) in Laviana, a municipality within the province and autonomous community of Asturias, in northern Spain.

Villages

References  

Parishes in Laviana